The following is a list of the national television and radio networks and announcers who have broadcast the National League Division Series. It does not include any announcers who may have appeared on local radio broadcasts produced by the participating teams.

Television

2020s

2010s

Notes
TNT was scheduled to air three entire Division Series games in 2011 due to conflicts with TBS. On October 1, it aired Game 2 of the Tampa Bay Rays vs. the Texas Rangers at 7 p.m. ET, which overlapped with the end of Game 1 of the St. Louis Cardinals vs. the Philadelphia Phillies and the continuation of Game 1 of the Detroit Tigers vs. the New York Yankees on TBS. (The latter was also to have been Game 2, but Game 1 was suspended after  innings due to rain.) On October 2, it aired the rescheduled Game 2 between the Tigers and the Yankees at 3 p.m. ET, two hours before Game 2 of the Arizona Diamondbacks vs. the Milwaukee Brewers on TBS. On October 4, it aired Game 3 of the Diamondbacks vs. the Brewers at 9:30 p.m. ET, one hour after Game 3 of the Tigers vs. the Yankees started on TBS.
For the 2012 and 2013 seasons, TBS has been awarded the rights to televise both Wild Card Playoff games that occur on the day before the Division Series games. In exchange, MLB Network has been awarded the rights to televise two of the Division Series games that previously belonged to TBS.
Beginning in 2014, when Fox Sports began a new television contract with Major League Baseball, FS1 airs 40 regular season MLB games (mostly on Saturdays), along with up to 15 post-season games (eight Divisional Series games and one best-of-7 League Championship Series). The deal resulted in a reduction of MLB coverage on the Fox network, which will air 12 regular season games, the All-Star Game, and the World Series.

2000s

Notes
ABC Family's coverage of the 2002 Division Series was produced by ESPN. The reason that games were on ABC Family instead of ESPN was because The Walt Disney Company (ESPN's parent company) bought Fox Family from News Corporation. The ABC Family/ESPN inherited Division Series package was included in Fox's then exclusive television contract with Major League Baseball (initiated in 2001). ABC Family had no other choice but to fulfill the contract handed to them. The only usage of the ABC Family "bug" was for a ten-second period when returning from a commercial break (in the lower right corner of the screen).
During the  League Division Series on ESPN, Joe Morgan left Game 1 of the Dodgers-Mets series after six innings in order to call Game 2 of the Tigers-Yankees game that same night (October 4). However, the latter game was ultimately rained out.
Turner Sports provided a provisional plan in which if a League Division Series game televised on TBS ran into the start of the next LDS game scheduled to air on TBS, then TNT would provide supplementary coverage of the latter games' early moments. To be more specific, all games in the Division Series round were presented back-to-back, with each game scheduled for a 3½-hour window. If a game exceeded this window, the first pitch of the next game would be switched to TNT. If a game ended within 3½ hours, the studio team would return for interstitial programming.
In 2007, TBS switched the starts of four games to TNT in the Division Series round because the previous games exceeded the time limit. TNT was also scheduled to air Game 4 of the Diamondbacks-Cubs series, which overlapped with Game 3 of the Red Sox-Angels series, but the former game was not played; the night before, the D-Backs completed a three-game sweep of the Cubs.

1990s

Notes
1995 marked the only year of postseason coverage provided by "The Baseball Network", which was a revenue sharing joint venture between Major League Baseball, ABC and NBC. "The Baseball Network" was also scheduled to cover the Division Series in 1994, but plans were scrapped when a strike caused the postseason to be canceled. All games in the first two rounds (including the League Championship Series) were scheduled in the same time slot for regional telecasts. Initially, under the alternating six-year plan, ABC would've covered the Division Series in even numbered years (as well as the World Series in even numbered years) while NBC would've covered the Division Series in odd numbered years (in even numbered years, they would've gotten the rights to the All-Star Game and League Championship Series).
From 1996–2000, NBC aired LDS games on Tuesday/Friday/Saturday nights. Fox aired LDS games on Wednesday/Thursday nights, Saturdays in the late afternoon, plus Sunday/Monday nights (if necessary). Meanwhile, ESPN carried many afternoon LDS contests. At this point, all playoff games were nationally televised (mostly in unopposed timeslots).

1981

Notes
In 1981, as means to recoup revenue lost during a players' strike, Major League Baseball set up a special additional playoff round (as a prelude to the League Championship Series). ABC televised the American League Division Series while NBC televised the National League Division Series. The Division Series round wouldn't be officially instituted until 14 years later. Games 1, 3 and 5 of the Phillies/Expos series and Games 2–3 and 5 of the Dodgers/Astros series were regionally televised.

Radio

National

2020s

Notes
 Due to health and safety concerns related to the COVID-19 pandemic, all of ESPN Radio's commentators for the 2020 postseason called the games at the ESPN studios in Bristol, Connecticut.

2010s

2000s

1990s

1981

Local

2000s

Notes
 2001 - Locally, the Arizona-St. Louis portion of the 2001 NLDS was called on KTAR-AM in Phoenix by Greg Schulte, Jeff Munn, Rod Allen (Games 4–5) and Jim Traber, and on KMOX-AM in St. Louis by Jack Buck (Games 3–4), Mike Shannon, and Dan McLaughlin (Games 1–2, 5), while the Atlanta-Houston portion of the 2001 NLDS was called on WSB-AM in Atlanta by Pete Van Wieren, Skip Caray, Don Sutton, and Joe Simpson, and on KTRH-AM in Houston by Milo Hamilton and Alan Ashby.

References

External links 
Division Series Video
Division Series numbers game
Searchable Network TV Broadcasts
Episode List: MLB NLDS - TV Tango

Broadcasters
+NLDS
ABC Sports
Major League Baseball on Fox
Major League Baseball on NBC
Turner Sports
ESPN announcers
ESPN2
Freeform (TV channel)
ESPN Radio
CBS Radio Sports
MLB Network
Major League Baseball on the radio